John Hennigan may refer to:

John Hennigan (wrestler) (born 1979), American professional wrestler and actor
John Hennigan (poker player) (born 1970), American professional poker player
John Hennigan (politician), Irish Cumann na nGaedhael politician